Laurel Ridge Elementary School may refer to:
 Laurel Ridge Elementary School, DeKalb County, Georgia, near Decatur (Atlanta area) - DeKalb County School District
 Laurel Ridge Elementary School, Fairfax, Virginia (Washington DC area) - Fairfax County Public Schools